Prasert Sumpradit (born 22 November 1962) is a Thai weightlifter. He competed in the men's light heavyweight event at the 1992 Summer Olympics.

References

1962 births
Living people
Prasert Sumpradit
Prasert Sumpradit
Weightlifters at the 1992 Summer Olympics
Place of birth missing (living people)
Asian Games medalists in weightlifting
Weightlifters at the 1990 Asian Games
Weightlifters at the 1994 Asian Games
Prasert Sumpradit
Medalists at the 1990 Asian Games
Prasert Sumpradit